The Wayback Machine or WABAC Machine is a fictional time machine from the segment "Peabody's Improbable History", a recurring feature of the 1960s cartoon series The Rocky and Bullwinkle Show. The Wayback Machine is a plot device used to transport the characters Mr. Peabody and Sherman back in time to visit important events in human history.

The Rocky and Bullwinkle Show
The Wayback machine was a central element of the "Peabody's Improbable History" cartoon segment. The machine was invented by Mr. Peabody, a genius, polymath, and bow tie-wearing beagle, as a birthday gift for his adopted pet boy, Sherman. By allowing them to visit famous historical people or events, the Wayback provided educational adventures for Sherman. At the request of Mr. Peabody ("Sherman, set the Wayback machine to..."), Sherman
would set the Wayback controls to a time and place of historical importance, and by walking through a door
in the Wayback machine, they would be instantly transported there. Examples of places or people visited are
the Marquess of Queensberry and the rules of boxing, the imprisonment and memoirs of Casanova, and Jim Bowie and the Bowie knife.  The machine apparently later returned Mr. Peabody and Sherman to the present, although the return trip was never shown. The segment traditionally ended with a pun.

The Wayback has two main quirks. Firstly, it automatically translates all languages into English for their convenience. Secondly (and more critically), the historical figures and situations that they encounter are distorted in some crucial way. The main focus of the shorts is thus the restoration of historical events to their proper course, albeit in a characteristically frivolous and anachronistic way.

Either of the names Wayback or WABAC  are in common usage, with the term "WAYBACK" explicitly indicated during the segment in which Mr. Peabody and Sherman visit the "Charge of the Light Brigade".  The precise meaning of the acronym WABAC is unknown. According to Gerard Baldwin, one of the show's directors, the name "WABAC" is a reference to the UNIVAC I.  Mid-century, large-sized computers often had names that ended in "AC" (generally for "Automatic/Analogue Computer" or similar), such as ENIAC or UNIVAC. The term "Wayback" suggests the common expression "way back in [some former time]".

In popular culture
The concept or term "Wayback machine" has been adopted in popular culture as a convenient way to introduce issues or events of the past, often employing the original line "Sherman, set the Wayback machine to...". This introduction was used by the character Kevin Flynn in the film Tron, for example. As in the original cartoon, the Wayback Machine is often invoked to suggest the audience follow the narrator back to the past. Frequently such visits to the past are trips of nostalgia, remembering times, places, or things of the not-so-distant past.

One example of popular usage occurred in a 1995 episode of the television show NewsRadio, "Goofy Ball" (Season 2, Episode 2), in which station owner Jimmy James (Stephen Root) says: "Dave, don't mess with a man with a Wayback Machine. I can make it so you were never born".

An old Google webpage that lived from 1998 to the late-2000s has the header "Sherman, set the WayBack machine..." above its prototype logos.

The Wayback Machine of the Internet Archive was named after Peabody and Sherman's Wayback.

The Wayback machine is frequently referenced in the Stuff You Should Know podcast when discussing events in the past.

Mr. Peabody and Sherman film (2014)

The movie studio DreamWorks Animation announced in 2006 and again in 2012 that they were creating an animated movie entitled Mr. Peabody & Sherman, which was released March 7, 2014. The WABAC machine is a central element to the plot. In the movie, the acronym is revealed to be Wavelength Acceleration Bidirectional Asynchronous Controller (WABAC).

See also
 Back to the Future (film)
 DeLorean time machine
 Memory hole
 TARDIS
 Time travel

References

External links
 Toonopedia entry on Peabody's Improbable History
 Andy's Anachronisms: Time Travel Television Reviews: Peabody's Improbable History
  The Wayback Machine at archive.org
 WABAC BBS

Fictional spacecraft
Fictional technology
Rocky and Bullwinkle characters
The Adventures of Rocky and Bullwinkle and Friends
Time travel devices
Time travel in television
Fictional elements introduced in 1959